The Hotaling Building is a historic building in San Francisco, California. It is located at 451 Jackson Street in Jackson Square. It is a San Francisco Designated Landmark.

History
It was built in 1866 by Anson Parsons Hotaling to originally be a hotel. However, Hotaling later moved to the whiskey business. It was also one of the few surviving buildings after the 1906 Earthquake and Fire, thanks to a mile long fire hose that stretched through Fisherman's Wharf and Telegraph Hill. Because of the saving of the building, Charles K. Field once stated famously, "If, as they say, God spanked the town for being over-frisky, why did He burn His churches down and spare Hotaling's whiskey?"

After the earthquake and fire, the Hotaling business started to decline. However the building was revived in 1952 when Dorothy Kneedler Lawenda and Harry Lawenda of Kneedler-Fauchere purchased it and made it a center for their wholesale interior decorative design elements firm. The name Jackson Square was adopted, many buildings were renovated and the street became the interior design center for San Francisco for decades.

References

See also
List of San Francisco Designated Landmarks

Buildings and structures in San Francisco
Hotel buildings completed in 1866
1866 establishments in California
San Francisco Designated Landmarks
Victorian architecture in California
Hotels in San Francisco